"Everybody" is a song written and performed by Tommy Roe.  The song reached #3 on the Billboard Hot 100 and #9 on the UK Singles Chart in 1963.  The song appeared on his 1966 album, Sweet Pea.

The song was produced by Felton Jarvis.  The song was recorded at FAME Studios. The musicians on the record included Norbert Putnam on bass, David Briggs on piano, Bobby West on guitar, and Jerry Carrigan on drums.

The song was ranked #38 on Billboard magazine's Top Hot 100 songs of 1963.

Other versions
Ray Peterson released the song as a single in 1965.
American Spring released a version of the song on their 1972 album, Spring.
German rock group Asterix covered the song in 1970. The single version was included in the 1998 CD reissue of their album, Asterix.

References

1963 songs
1963 singles
1965 singles
Songs written by Tommy Roe
Tommy Roe songs
Song recordings produced by Felton Jarvis
ABC Records singles